Yahya Yakhlif (Arabic: يحيى يخلف) (born 1944) is a Palestinian writer and a novelist. He was born in Samakh, a Palestinian village that was abandoned during the 1948 Palestinian exodus, four years after Yakhlif's birth. Consequently, Yakhlif and his family became displaced refugees.

As an author and novelist, Yakhlif has published several novels and short story collections. His novel about the last days of Samakh, A Lake Beyond the Wind, was translated into English by Christopher Tingley and May Jayyusi and published by Interlink Books in 1998 in its Emerging Voices series. Ma' Al Sama, a more recent novel, also explores the condition of Palestinian exile. Ma' Al Sama was nominated for the 2009 Arabic Booker Prize.

References

Palestinian novelists
Palestinian short story writers
1944 births
Living people